Kathleen Fraser (born March 29, 1986) is a Canadian sprint kayaker. Competing in the K-4 500 metres event she won gold medals at the 2011 and 2015 Pan American Games and placed eighth at the 2016 Olympics.

Fraser took up kayaking aged 14. She studied geography, parks and recreation at the Lakehead University.

References

External links
 

1986 births
Canadian female canoeists
Living people
Canoeists at the 2011 Pan American Games
Canoeists at the 2015 Pan American Games
Pan American Games gold medalists for Canada
People from Pierrefonds-Roxboro
Canoeists from Montreal
Anglophone Quebec people
Canoeists at the 2016 Summer Olympics
Olympic canoeists of Canada
Pan American Games medalists in canoeing
Medalists at the 2011 Pan American Games
Medalists at the 2015 Pan American Games